Madhutila Eco Park (Madhutila) is deep green forest and eco park in Sherpur District.

Location
Madhutila Eco Park is in Puragaon Union under the Madhutila Forest Range in Nalitabari Upazila of Sherpur district of Bangladesh in 1999. It is 380 acres. It falls close to the Bangladesh-India border.

Areas
Madhutila Eco Park include region Mymensingh, Sherpur, Jamalpur, Tangail, Netrokona and Kishoreganj districts.

References

Further reading
 
 
 

Protected areas of Bangladesh